Bactra robustana is a moth belonging to the family Tortricidae. The species was first described by Hugo Theodor Christoph in 1872.

It is native to the  Palearctic including Europe. where it is a salt marsh species.  Genitalia dissection is necessary for differentiation from other Bactra species. Julius von Kennel provides a full description.

The larvae feed internally in the stems of Bolboschoenus maritimus.

The flight period is June and July, and the moths can be attracted to light.

References

Bactrini